Diplotropis is a genus of trees (family Fabaceae) found in Brazil and parts of northern Argentina.

References

External links
Diplotropis photos

Leptolobieae
Fabaceae genera